The Interview (Jenipapo) is a 1995 Brazilian film directed by Monique Gardenberg and starring Otávio Augusto and Patrick Bauchau.

References

External links 

1995 films
Brazilian drama films